Dehnow-ye Herzang (also known as Deh Now and Dehnow-ye Herzan) is a village in Jorjafak Rural District, in the Central District of Zarand County, Kerman Province, Iran. At the 2006 census, its population was 32, in 5 families.

References 

Populated places in Zarand County